Tai Mei Tuk (officially known as  in Chinese; formerly and still commonly known as ; also written as  or ) is a place close to the Plover Cove Reservoir in the Tai Po District, New Territories, Hong Kong.

Administration
Tai Mei Tuk is a recognized village under the New Territories Small House Policy. It is one of the villages represented within the Tai Po Rural Committee. For electoral purposes, Tai Mei Tuk is part of the Shuen Wan constituency, which was formerly represented by So Tat-leung until October 2021.

History
Historically, Ting Kok, together with the nearby Hakka villages of Shan Liu, Lai Pik Shan, Lo Tsz Tin, Lung Mei and Tai Mei Tuk belonged to the Ting Kok Yeuk alliance.

Name
Tai Mei Tuk means "the very end" in the Cantonese language which depicts the landscape. The homonym character  (tuk) is borrowed for the name.

Features
Tai Mei Tuk is a popular place for barbecues and cycling. There are villages and a harbour nearby, where many restaurants can be found. Bicycles are also available for hire in the villages.

The Tai Mei Tuk Sea Activity Centre of the Scout Association of Hong Kong is located in the area and also provides sea Scouting activities in Hong Kong.

The Hong Kong Government has holiday bungalows for government employees at Tai Mei Tuk.

See also
 Bride's Pool

References

External links

 Delineation of area of existing village Tai Mei Tuk (Tai Po) for election of resident representative (2019 to 2022)

Populated places in Hong Kong
Tai Po District